Armas Hirvonen (25 May 1896 Duderhof, Ingria – 30 September 1972 Helsinki) was a Finnish cinematographer.

Filmography
 1931: Öösel (feature film; director)
 1937: Juurakon Hulda
 1938: Niskavuoren naiset
 1938: Sysmäläinen
 1938: Vihreä kulta
 1939: Rikas tyttö
 1940: Yövartija vain ...
 1941: Totinen torvensoittaja
 1944: Anja tulee kotiin
 1944: Suomisen Olli rakastuu
 1945: Vastamyrkky
 1945: Suomisen Olli yllättää
 1945: Anna Liisa
 1946: Nuoruus Sumussa
 1947: Kuudes käsky
 1948: Tuhottu nuoruus
 1950: Hukkareissu
 1951: Hetta nousee tuhkasta
 1953: Kultaa ja kunniaa

References

1896 births
1972 deaths
Finnish cinematographers